Saint-Bruno-de-Montarville is an off-island suburb of Montreal, in southwestern Quebec, Canada, on the south bank of the Saint Lawrence River just east of Montreal. It lies on the west flank of Mont Saint-Bruno, one of the Monteregian Hills. The population as of the Canada 2011 Census was 26,107. It merged with Longueuil in 2002 but de-merged in 2006.

The city is well known to Montrealers and its neighbouring population for Mont Saint-Bruno, location to both Mont-Saint-Bruno National Park and Ski Mont Saint-Bruno, a ski facility and school.

Etymology
There are two prevailing hypotheses on the origin of the city's name:
 That the city was named after Bruno of Cologne and the Montarville seigneury. The name "Montarville" is a homonym of a village of Eure-et-Loir in France: Montharville, whose etymology is uncertain. The name was written in its Latin form, Mons Harvilla in the 12th century – in other words "Harics farm's mount", a name of Germanic origins also found in Harville (Hairici villa, 9th century). However, this uncommon composition of a Roman appellation ("mont") associated with the Norman toponymy "-ville" place name casts doubts on this explication. It could be the name of an unidentified Germanic individual.
 Quebec's toponymy commission suggests another hypothesis to explain the origin of the city's name. "Montarville" could be a portmanteau of "montagne" (French for mountain) and "Boucherville" after Pierre Boucher de Boucherville, the region's first seigneur. The hypothesis rests on the fact that the descendants of de Boucherville were named Montarville, Niverville, etc. The patron saint of the city could be explained by the sale of the seigneury to François-Pierre Bruneau, whose name was slightly transformed.

History

The seigneury of Montarville

Pierre Boucher de Boucherville Junior was granted the Montarville seigneury in 1710 by the governor of New France Philippe de Rigaud de Vaudreuil. In 1723, it was noted that clearing had not begun and no one was inhabiting the seigneury yet.

The ownership remained in the Boucher family until 1829, when René Boucher de la Bruère sold half his land and his rights as a seigneur to  François-Pierre Bruneau of Montréal. He died in 1851 and his brother Oliver-Théophile Bruneau (who was the first professor of anatomy at McGill University), was the last seigneur of Montarville from 1851 until the seigneural system was abolished in 1854.

While agriculture was the primary subsistence and economical activity of the region, the seigneury of Montarville, thanks to its proximity to Mount Saint-Bruno, benefited much from the industrial activity that developed around the hydraulic power it could harvest from the mountain's many ponds and streams. The first water mill was erected in 1725 and in the 19th century, they numbered six in the territory and permitted such activities as grinding grain, milling wood, tanning leather and carding and spinning wool.

The 19th century also saw the diversification of the seigneury's agricultural activities through increased animal husbandry, orchards, and maple syrup collection.

From parish to village to city

At the beginning of the 19th century, families residing on the western flank of the mountain were under the clerical responsibility of the parish of Boucherville while families from the southern flank were under the responsibility of the parish of Saint-Joseph de Chambly. As a consequence, the tithe was being paid to two different parishes, so in 1809 a first request to transform the seigneury into a parish was made to Mgr Joseph-Octave Plessis, Archbishop of Quebec. This request was met with a refusal. It would be thirty-three years before the Montarvillans attempted to form into their own parish again.

It is worth mentioning that in 1838 during the Patriotes Rebellion, François-Pierre Bruneau's manor was occupied by the Patriotes and that one of them, André Proteau, was from the seigneury.

In 1842, a petition totaling about sixty signatures was presented to Mgr Ignace Bourget, Bishop of Montreal who agreed to the demand, and in the same year he signed a canonical decree officiating the creation of the parish of Saint-Bruno. François-Pierre Bruneau was honored with the choice of the titular saint, Saint Bruno.

In line with the Durham Report's recommendation to modernize municipal structures in 1840 (culminating in the abolition of the seigneury system in 1854) and the Acte pour abroger certaines ordonnances et pour faire de meilleures dispositions pour l'établissement d'autorités locales et municipales dans le Bas-Canada (Act to abrogate certain ordinances and to make better dispositions to establish local and municipal authorities in Lower-Canada), on 1 July 1845 the Legislative Assembly created more than 325 municipal corporations in eastern Canada of which Saint-Bruno, then with a population of 800, was a part. The following year on 9 October 1846, the parish municipality of Saint-Bruno was born through an official proclamation. For a few years, Saint-Bruno remained part of the municipality of Chambly but in 1855, as mandated by the Loi constituant en municipalités toutes paroisses de plus de 300 personnes (Law making into a municipality every parish of more than 300 persons), the parish municipality became fully autonomous and its two names, "Saint-Bruno" and "Montarville", were joined into the designation still used to this day.

It incorporated as a city in 1958.

Merger and demerger

In 2000, the Parti Québécois governments of Lucien Bouchard and Bernard Landry introduced a series of legislative measures with the intent of reorganizing and merging many of Quebec's municipalities. In 2002, following the adoption of bill 170, Saint-Bruno merged with other municipalities on Montreal's south shore to form the city of Longueuil. Following public outcry and a referendum, the city demerged from Longueuil and was reconstituted on 1 January 2006, but remained within the agglomeration of Longueuil, which remains responsible for a series of services to the population.

 Demographics 

Language
The 2006 census found that about 85% of residents spoke French as a mother tongue (including persons who had more than one mother tongue), and that about 11% of residents spoke English as a mother tongue (also including persons who had more than one mother tongue).  The next most common mother tongue was Italian.Mother tongue language (2006)'''

Transportation
Saint-Bruno-de-Montarville is served by the Saint-Bruno commuter rail station on the Réseau de transport métropolitain's Mont-Saint-Hilaire line. Local bus service is provided by the Réseau de transport de Longueuil.

Education
The South Shore Protestant Regional School Board previously served the municipality.  The French language school board Commission Scolaire des Patriotes  oversees 3 primary education schools (École Albert-Schweitzer, École De Montarville and École Monseigneur-Gilles-Gervais) and one secondary education school (École Secondaire du Mont-Bruno).  The English language school board Riverside School Board oversees primary schools Mount Bruno School and Courtland Park International.

Mont Saint-Bruno
The town resides at the foot of Mont Saint-Bruno, one of the mountains that make up the Monteregian Hills. The mountain is home to a provincial park, Parc National du Mont-Saint-Bruno, as well as a ski hill, Ski Mont Saint-Bruno.

Notable people

The following are notable residents or past residents of Saint-Bruno:
 Maryse Andraos, writer
 Joël Bouchard, retired professional NHL hockey player
 Claude Crépeau, computer scientist
 L. Denis Desautels, former Auditor General of Canada
 Guy Laliberté, shareholder and founder of Cirque du Soleil 
 Georges Larivière, professor, writer, ice hockey coach
 Marie-Mai, pop singer
 Serge Savard, retired professional NHL hockey player
 Sword, Canadian heavy metal band
 Maxime Talbot, professional NHL hockey player
 Sébastien Leblanc, retired professional tennis player
 Annette and Cécile Dionne, first quintuplets known to have survived their infancy

List of former mayors

1866-1868: Joseph-Octave Leduc
1868-1870: Antoine-Dominique Hurtubise
1870-1872: Joseph-Octave Leduc
1872-1874: Tancrède Boucher de Grosbois, M.D.
1874-1877: Timothé Sauriol
1878: Jérémie Huet
1879-1886: Timothé Sauriol
1886: Michel Provost
1887-1891: Toussaint Bachand
1891-1893: Frank Bruneau
1893: Vital Delière
1894: Louis Baillargeon
1895-1902: Vital Delière
1903-1906: Ephrem Huette
1907: Clovis Mongeau
1908: Stanislas Boissy
1909-1910: Lucien Caillé

1911-1912: Philias Grisé
1913-1916: Oscar Berthiaume
1917-1920: Louis-Arthur Léonard
1921-1932: Armand Huet
1933-1939: Paul-Émile Huet
1939-1949: Ernest Dulude
1949-1952: J. Donat Fournier, M.D.
1952-1953: Ernest Dulude
1953-1955: Henri C. Bois
1955-1959: Hubert Kéroack
1960-1968: Gérard Filion
1968-1969:  Claude Allard
1969-1971: Gérard Lepage
1971-1975: J. James Verge
1975-1979: J. Y. Serge Dazé
1979-2001: Marcel Dulude
2002-2006: Merged with the city of Longueuil''
2007-2013: Claude Benjamin
2013-2021: Martin Murray
2021-current: Ludovic Grisé Farand

Gallery

See also
List of cities in Quebec

References

External links

City web site

 
Cities and towns in Quebec